Těškovice is a municipality and village in Opava District in the Moravian-Silesian Region of the Czech Republic. It has about 800 inhabitants.

History
The first written mention of Těškovice is from 1377. The village was probably founded at the turn of the 12th and 13th centuries.

References

External links

Villages in Opava District